The 1983 U.S. Open was the 83rd U.S. Open, held June 16–20 at Oakmont Country Club in Oakmont, Pennsylvania, a suburb northeast of Pittsburgh. Larry Nelson won the second of his three major titles, and only U.S. Open, one stroke ahead of defending champion Tom Watson.

Watson and Seve Ballesteros shared the 54-hole lead, with Nelson a stroke back. Nelson was 7-over for the championship after four holes in his third round, but then played the final fourteen holes on Saturday in 7-under to get to even-par 213, one shot behind the co-leaders. Watson was attempting to become the first to successfully defend a U.S. Open title in over thirty years, last achieved by Ben Hogan in 1951.

In the final round, Watson opened with a front-nine 31 to open up a three-stroke lead over Nelson, who shot 33. Nelson tied Watson with a birdie at 14 after Watson had bogeyed 10 and 12. A storm came through Oakmont around 5:30 p.m., which postponed play to the following morning. Watson was on the 14th green, Nelson on the 16th tee, tied at four-under for the championship.

On Monday morning, Nelson holed a  birdie putt at the par-3 16th, but then three-putted at the 18th for bogey. Nelson finished at four-under 280 total and waited for Watson. After he failed to save a par from a bunker at the 17th, Watson was one stroke behind Nelson. Watson needed a birdie at 18 to tie but his approach flew over the green. Nelson became the winner when Watson failed to hole out his chip shot.

Nelson established a new tournament record with 132 strokes over the last 36 holes, breaking Gene Sarazen's 51-year-old mark. It was the second consecutive runner-up finish at Oakmont for Watson, who lost a sudden-death playoff to John Mahaffey five years earlier at the PGA Championship in 1978.

Arnold Palmer made his last cut in a U.S. Open here and tied for 60th place. He played the Open just once more, in 1994 when he was granted a special exemption when it returned to Oakmont. Future major champion Paul Azinger made his major championship debut but missed the cut. Johnny Miller, the champion when the Open was last played at Oakmont in 1973, battled health issues, and also missed the cut.

This was the sixth U.S. Open at Oakmont, and ninth major championship. Ticket prices were $24 per day, cash only; practice days

Course layout

Source:

Lengths of the course for previous major championships:

Before 1962, the first hole was played as a par 5.

Past champions in the field

Made the cut

Missed the cut

Round summaries

First round
Thursday, June 16, 1983

Second round
Friday, June 17, 1983
Saturday, June 18, 1983

Amateurs: Faxon (+8), Sherman (+9), Sigel (+13), Lewis (+15), Rinker (+15), Moise (+18), McNamara (+19), Taylor (+21), Farlow (+23).

Third round
Saturday, June 18, 1983

Source:

Final round
Sunday, June 19, 1983
Monday, June 20, 1983

Source:

Amateurs: Brad Faxon (+18), Sherman (+20).

Scorecard
Final round

Cumulative tournament scores, relative to par
{|class="wikitable" span = 50 style="font-size:85%;
|-
|style="background: Pink;" width=10|
|Birdie
|style="background: PaleGreen;" width=10|
|Bogey
|style="background: Green;" width=10|
|Double bogey
|}
Source:

References

External links
 GolfCompendium.com – 1983 U.S. Open
 USGA  – Nelson: The forgotten Open champion at Oakmont
 USOpen.com – 1983

U.S. Open (golf)
Golf in Pennsylvania
U.S. Open
U.S. Open (golf)
U.S. Open (golf)